Ernesto Maria Pasquali (1883–1919) was an Italian pioneering film producer and director. Originally a journalist he was employed by Ambrosio Film before he set up the Turin-based Pasquali Film, one of Italy's leading production companies. Shortly after his death in 1919 it was subsumed into larger conglomerate Unione Cinematografica Italiana.

References

Bibliography
 Abel, Richard. Encyclopedia of Early Cinema. Taylor & Francis, 2005.
 Brunetta, Gian Piero. The History of Italian Cinema: A Guide to Italian Film from Its Origins to the Twenty-first Century.  Princeton University Press, 2009.

External links

1883 births
1919 deaths
French film directors
Italian film producers
People from the Province of Pavia
20th-century Italian journalists